Tristan Vautier (born 22 August 1989) is a French professional racing driver.

Racing career

Formula Renault
Born in Saint-Martin-d'Hères, Isère, Vautier began his career in the French Formula Renault Campus series in 2006, where he finished runner-up. He moved up to the main Championnat de France Formula Renault 2.0 series in 2007, finishing fourth, also competing in some events in the Eurocup Formula Renault 2.0, scoring a 2nd and 3rd in Zolder. In 2008 the French series was replaced by the West European Cup, in which Vautier finished sixth.

Formula Palmer Audi
Vautier moved to the Formula Palmer Audi series in 2009, where he finished fourth with six victories.

FIA Formula Two Championship
Vautier made his FIA Formula Two Championship debut at Circuit de Catalunya, in place of Edoardo Piscopo. Vautier excelled in the pre-race tests and in the first race, where he finished third behind Andy Soucek and Mikhail Aleshin. He also finished in the points in the second race, finishing sixth. Those two results were enough to place him thirteenth overall in the championship standings.

Star Mazda
2010 saw Vautier move to the American Star Mazda Championship driving for Andersen Racing. Vautier won the season-opener at Sebring Raceway and then in June at New Jersey Motorsports Park. However, several mechanical issues saw him achieve only fifth in the final standings despite being the only driver other than champion Conor Daly to win more than one race. He returned to the series in 2011, this time driving for JDC MotorSports. He won four races and finished every race in the top five, winning the championship over Connor De Phillippi by 25 points. With the title he won a scholarship to move to Firestone Indy Lights in 2012 through the Road to Indy program.

Indy Lights
Vautier signed with Sam Schmidt Motorsports to race in Firestone Indy Lights in 2012. He won the pole in his first race on the Streets of St. Petersburg and took a flag-to-flag victory, duplicating his Star Mazda feat from two years before by winning on debut. Another win on the Milwaukee Mile came in the midst of a remarkable run of 20 consecutive Top 5 finishes (including the final 2 Star Mazda events of 2010, and his championship season of 2011) in his Road to Indy career. The streak ended at Toronto when a first-lap collision put him out of the race for the first time in an open-wheel car in nearly two years.

Vautier clinched the 2012 Firestone Indy Lights championship by eight points over Esteban Guerrieri. Winning a partial scholarship to compete in the IndyCar Series in 2013 through the Road to Indy program.

IndyCar
Vautier signed to compete in the 2013 IndyCar Series season for Schmidt Peterson Motorsports. He is the first driver to be champion of two rungs of the Road to Indy ladder and move onto the IndyCar Series. Vautier finished 20th in points with a best finish of tenth in the second race of the season at Barber Motorsports Park. Vautier qualified in the Firestone Fast-Six on his debut race in St Petersburg, and 3rd for the following round in Barber. He won rookie of the year honours. He finished sixteenth in his first Indianapolis 500 race.

The Frenchman returned to IndyCar in 2015 as a part-time driver for Dale Coyne Racing. He qualified James Davison's car for the Indianapolis 500, then raced in place of Carlos Huertas. A week later, he finished fourth in Detroit for the second race, starting last on the grid after qualifying was cancelled. His showing got Dale Coyne to keep him in the car for the remainder of the season, and he backed his strong Detroit result with a 6th place in Mid-Ohio.

Sports car racing

Summary:

2009: French GT Championship (Viper GT3) - 1 win - 2 podiums

2012: Spa 24 Hours - Team Akka-ASP - Ferrari 458 GT3 - 5th Pro-Am

2014: Spa 24 Hours - Team Akka-ASP - Ferrari 458 GT3

2015: BlancPain Endurance Series - Team Akka-ASP - Ferrari 458 GT3

2016: BlancPain Sprint Series - Team Akka-ASP - Mercedes GT3 - 1 win - 2 podiums

      Spa 24 Hours - 2nd Overall

2017: Imsa GTD - SunEnergy1 Racing - 1 pole - 2 podiums

      BlancPain Endurance Series - 1 win

2018: 

      InterContinental GT Champion (Mercedes Factory)

      BlancPain Endurance Series - 3rd overall

      Nurburgring 24 - Top-10

      Imsa - Cadillac Dpi Team SDR - Sebring 12h pole

2019: InterContinental GT - VLN Series/Nurburgring 24 (Mercedes Factory)

      Imsa - Cadillac Dpi Team JDC
  
2020: Imsa - Cadillac Dpi Team JDC/Mustang Sampling Racing

2021: Imsa - Cadillac Dpi Team JDC/Mustang Sampling Racing - Sebring 12h Win

2022: Imsa - Cadillac Dpi Team JDC/Mustang Sampling Racing - Rolex 24 - pole - 3rd place finish - Sebring 12h - 2nd

Vautier debuted Sports Car racing while still racing open wheels, in the 2009 French GT Championship, and won on his debut race in Nogaro, teaming-up with French driver Jean-Charles Levy.

In 2014, Vautier was hired by the Mazda factory team to race at the four endurance races of the 2014 United SportsCar Championship in a LMP2 diesel prototype. At the 2015 24 Hours of Daytona he joined JDC/Miller, resulting third in the Prototype Challenge class.

The Frenchman has completed the 24 Hours of Spa five times for team Akka-ASP, in 2012, 2014, 2016, 2017 and 2018, finishing 2nd overall in 2016 on an AMG-Factory backed car alongside Rosenqvist and Van der Zande. He ended the 2016 season by winning the Blancpain GT Sprint final race in Barcelona, teamed-up with Rosenqvist.

He returned to full-time racing in the US in 2017 with Mercedes-AMG customer Team SunEnergy1 racing, teaming-up with Team owner Kenny Habul, and Boris Said. Vautier set Sebring's GTD track record on his way to pole position for the 12-Hour race, before finishing on the podium after a late comeback in the closing stages. He also returned to the Blanpain GT Series with Team Akka-ASP, teaming-up with Mercedes driver Dani Juncadella and open wheel ace Felix Serralles, closing the season by a win in Barcelona just as he did in 2016.

2017 also marks his return to IndyCar for a one-off, subbing for injured Sebastien Bourdais in Texas. Vautier went on to qualify 5th in the Dale Coyne Racing entry, and led 15 laps in the race before being caught in a multi-car incident.

In 2018, Vautier raced in prototypes alongside of his GT duties as Mercedes-AMG Factory driver, joining American Matt McMurry behind the wheel of the No. 90 Cadillac DPi-V.R. in the IMSA WeatherTech SportsCar Championship, driving for Spirit of Daytona Racing at four races, where he scored Pole Position for the 12 Hours of Sebring. At 2018 Petit Le Mans he finished fourth overall for Action Express Racing, partnering with Filipe Albuquerque and Christian Fittipaldi.

His GT Racing campaign for Mercedes-AMG saw him clinch the Intercontinental GT Challenge during the title-deciding race in WeatherTech Raceway Laguna Seca, scoring a 2nd place in the Bathurst 12 Hours and a win in the Suzuka 10 Hours.

He also debuted on the Nordschleife, finishing in the Top-10 in the 24 Hours of Nurburgring for Team Landgraff.

In 2019, Vautier joined JDC-Miller MotorSports to drive a Cadillac DPi at the IMSA WeatherTech Championship together with Mikhail Goikhberg, where he scored two 5th place finishes. He continued racing in GT3 as a Mercedes Factory driver for Team Strakka in the InterContinental GT and Team GetSpeed in the VLN Series and Nurburgring 24 Hours. 

The next season he had multiple co-drivers, but scored four top 5s.

Vautier won the 2021 12 Hours of Sebring with JDC, together with Loïc Duval and Sébastien Bourdais.

In 2022 Vautier scored pole and finished 3rd in the Rolex 24 Hours at Daytona teaming with Loïc Duval, Richard Westbrook and Ben Keating. He finished 2nd in the Sebring 12 Hours teaming with Westbrook and Duval.

The Frenchman represented Team ARC Bratislava in LMP2 at the 24 Hours of Le Mans, leading the pro-am class for most of the race before being taken out of contention by a radiator failure.

He is set to compete in the 2023 European Le Mans Series with Team APR.

Racing record

American open–wheel racing results
(key)

Star Mazda Championship

Indy Lights

IndyCar Series
(key)

Indianapolis 500

Complete Blancpain GT Series Sprint Cup results

Complete Bathurst 12 Hour results

Complete InterContinental GT Results
2018 Champion

Complete IMSA SportsCar Championship

† Vautier did not complete sufficient laps in order to score full points.
* Season still in progress.

Complete FIA World Endurance Championship results 
(key) (Races in bold indicate pole position) (Races in italics indicate fastest lap)

Complete 24 Hours of Le Mans results

References

External links

 
 

1989 births
Living people
People from Saint-Martin-d'Hères
French racing drivers
Formule Campus Renault Elf drivers
French Formula Renault 2.0 drivers
Formula Renault Eurocup drivers
Formula Renault 2.0 WEC drivers
Formula Palmer Audi drivers
FIA Formula Two Championship drivers
Indy Pro 2000 Championship drivers
IndyCar Series drivers
Indianapolis 500 drivers
Indy Lights champions
Indy Lights drivers
24 Hours of Daytona drivers
Rolex Sports Car Series drivers
Blancpain Endurance Series drivers
WeatherTech SportsCar Championship drivers
24 Hours of Spa drivers
Sportspeople from Isère
12 Hours of Sebring drivers
24 Hours of Le Mans drivers
JDC Motorsports drivers
Arrow McLaren SP drivers
Dale Coyne Racing drivers
Mercedes-AMG Motorsport drivers
SG Formula drivers
Action Express Racing drivers
La Filière drivers
Strakka Racing drivers
Graff Racing drivers
FIA Motorsport Games drivers
Nürburgring 24 Hours drivers